Adrian Cush (born 12 June 1970) is a former Gaelic footballer who played for the Donaghmore St Patrick's club and the Tyrone county team. He was part of the panel that played in Tyrone's second ever All-Ireland Final in 1995, and experienced success on the underage scene.

As his career took him to London, he had to stutter his playing for Tyrone, despite being at the top of his game. His is considered one of unfulfilled careers of Tyrone GAA.

Also known as Cushy the king. Part of the double act ‘the terrible twins’ alongside Peter the great Canavan

References

External links
 Quick biography from Hogan Stand Magazine,  1991

1970 births
Living people
Donaghmore St Patrick's Gaelic footballers
Tyrone inter-county Gaelic footballers